Ekaterina Knebeleva (born 13 December 1996) is an Uzbekistani professional racing cyclist, who last rode for the UCI Women's Team  during the 2019 women's road cycling season. Knebeleva set the national track records for 250 m time trial (standing start) and 500 m time trial at the 2019 Asian Track Cycling Championships.

Career
Knebeleva was selected to represent Uzbekistan at the 2019 Asian Track Cycling Championships. At the event she achieved third place in the Madison, teamed up with Olga Zabelinskaya, giving Knebeleva her first Bronze medal.

Major results
Sources:

Road
2013
 National Road Championships
2nd Time trial
6th Road race
2017
 National Road Championships
2nd Time trial
2018
 National Road Championships
1st  Road race
2nd Time trial
2019
 National Road Championships
3rd Road race
3rd Time trial

Track
2019
 3rd  Madison Asian Track Cycling Championships

References

External links

1996 births
Living people
Uzbekistani female cyclists
Place of birth missing (living people)
21st-century Uzbekistani women